Northwest Steel was a small shipyard in Portland, Oregon. Little is known of its background or owners, but during World War I the yard built cargo ships for the United States Shipping Board (USSB). Some 37 of the 46 ships ship built at Northwest Steel were the West boats, a series of  steel-hulled cargo ships built for the USSB on the West Coast of the United States as part of the World War I war effort.

It was headed by Joseph R. Bowles, who was indicted for bribing a government official in about 1918 and then convicted of contempt of court. He was later described as a "greedy, domineering and difficult person, with no sense of civic responsibility."

The first ship built at Northwest Steel was the cargo ship , originally launched on March 31, 1917, as the Cunard Line ship Vesterlide, a British-flagged ship sunk by German submarine U-55 in January 1918. The final ship built was the  tanker Swiftwind, completed in June 1921.

Notable ships built at Northwest Steel 

  ordered as West Minsi, cancelled, completed privately as Centaurus, renamed 1930 Portmar, bombed, beached and refloated at Darwin, Australia on 19 February 1942, torpedoed and lost 16 June 1943. 
  (originally Vesterlide)
 SS West Celeron
  Torpedoed and sunk 19 August 1942.
 
 
 
 
 SS West Pocasset, torpedoed and sunk as Chepo in January 1942
 
 
 
 
  
 
 
 
 
 
 USS West Modus

References

Bibliography

Defunct shipbuilding companies of the United States
History of transportation in Oregon
Manufacturing companies based in Portland, Oregon
Defunct manufacturing companies based in Oregon
Shipbuilding companies of Oregon
1921 disestablishments in Oregon
1910s establishments in Oregon
American companies disestablished in 1921